Amit Varma may refer to:

 Amit Varma (writer), Indian writer
 Amit Varma (actor) (born 1986), Indian television actor
 Amit Varma (doctor) (born 1968), critical care physician and businessman